Twin Rivers Community School District is an elementary school district headquartered in Bode, Iowa.

The district is mostly in Humboldt County with a section in Kossuth County. The district serves Bode, Livermore, and Ottosen.

History
The district previously had a grade sharing agreement with the Gilmore City–Bradgate Community School District.

In July 2011, the district began a whole grade sharing agreement with the Humboldt Community School District. In 2015, 37 students living in the Twin Rivers district in grades 6–12 attended the middle-high school operated by Humboldt.

References

External links
 Twin Rivers Community School District

School districts in Iowa
Education in Humboldt County, Iowa
Education in Kossuth County, Iowa